Mark Robin Jefferson (born 28 June 1976 in Oamaru, Otago) is a New Zealand cricketer who has played for Wellington and Northern Districts in the State Championship and the State Shield.

References

1976 births
Living people
New Zealand cricketers
Northern Districts cricketers
Wellington cricketers
Cricketers from Oamaru
North Island cricketers